New Thomson House, also known as the Penn-Kane Hotel, is a historic hotel located in Kane, Pennsylvania, United States.  It is a six-story brick structure constructed in 1907.  The hotel structure is now used as a mixed-use building.

It was listed on the National Register of Historic Places in 1984.

References

See also 
 National Register of Historic Places listings in McKean County, Pennsylvania

Hotels in Pennsylvania
Hotel buildings on the National Register of Historic Places in Pennsylvania
Buildings and structures in McKean County, Pennsylvania
National Register of Historic Places in McKean County, Pennsylvania